How Much Do You Love Me? is a 2005 French romantic comedy film written and directed by Bertrand Blier. It was released on 26 October 2005 in France and Belgium, and had a limited United States release on 18 March 2006. It was entered into the 28th Moscow International Film Festival where Blier won the Silver George for Best Director.

Plot
François, bored with his lonely life in Paris and dull office job, goes to a bar and meets Daniela, a beautiful Italian prostitute. Telling her he has won millions on the lottery, he says he will pay her 100,000 euros a month to live with him until his money runs out. She agrees but André, his friend and doctor, warns them his weak heart will not cope with an energetic sex life. After a meal at a restaurant, Daniela goes down with food poisoning and André, called to attend her, has a stroke and dies at the sight of her voluptuous naked body.

Coming home one day, François finds Daniela gone. At the bar where they met, he learns she has resumed her old trade. He picks up a pretty young prostitute named Muguet, which leads Daniela to confess that she had another man all along, a gangster named Charly who has reclaimed his woman. Since she says she loves François, Charly offers to sell her back to him for four million euros. After long negotiation, François refuses. Unhappy however at life with the coarse Charly, Daniela sneaks back to François' flat, only to find him in bed with his sexy North African neighbour.

Not having seen him for a long time, François' friends from his office turn up and a wild party starts. Daniela, ever a free spirit, disappears for a turn with a handsome man. Charly turns up with a gun, looking for Daniela, and is taken with François' neighbour. François admits that he never won the lottery and couldn't have paid Daniela. The film ends with the two together again.

Cast
 Monica Bellucci as Daniela de Montmartre
 Bernard Campan as François
 Gérard Depardieu as Charly
 Jean-Pierre Darroussin as André Migot
 Sara Forestier as Muguet
 François Rollin as Michael
 Michel Vuillermoz as The doctor
 Édouard Baer as The upset man
 Valérie Karsenti as François's colleague
 Michaël Abiteboul as François's colleague
 Fabienne Chaudat as François's colleague
 Jean Dell as The cemetery man

References

External links 
 
 
 

2005 films
2005 romantic comedy films
2000s French films
2000s French-language films
Films about prostitution in Paris
Films directed by Bertrand Blier
French romantic comedy films
Pan-Européenne films